is an anime television series adaptation of the Gunslinger Stratos video game series. It premiered on April 4, 2015.

Plot
The story revolves on a group of gunslingers, each from the two universes (Frontier Stratos and the 17th Far East Imperial City Management District) who participate in Operation Stratos, particularly on a group of four childhood friends: Tohru Kazasumi, Kyōka Katagiri, Kyōma Katagiri, and Shizune Rindo, who all must confront their own flaws and differences when they battle their alternate selves from another universe in order to survive.

Characters

Main characters

Main Weapon: Pistol (x2)
The main protagonist, superhero and character of the story. A high school student who does his best to avoid violence as possible. Tohru mainly wears his school uniform, but during combat, he wears a black outfit which is noticeably made up of a long scarf, a jacket, and a shirt inside that jacket, and his scarf has a star pin on the right side. Tohru's ability is the "Ninth Dimensional Space-Orientation", which allows him to understand special relations and control his location within the flow of time. He has a strong desire to protect Kyōka and is always considering her safety. Tohru has feelings for Kyōka and in the future, he and Kyōka get married.

Main Weapon: Machine gun
A childhood friend of Tohru. She has an ever-ready attitude and her mind is always concerned for Tohru's safety as she wants to protect him. Kyōka's has a rocky relationship with her older brother Kyōma since he is always interfering in her relationship with Tohru and getting in the way of the two off them. Kyōka will often hit or slap Kyōma followed by calling him "Stupid Big Brother" whenever Kyōma becomes overly protective of her or interrupts her time with Tohru. At times she will tell Tohru that he should become "President of the World" and kick out Kyōma from the Katagiri Group and run it himself. Kyōka is in love with Tohru and in the future, she and Tohru get married.

Main Weapon: Revolver/M61 Vulcan
Kyōka's older brother. He is a very serious and prideful person. Despite his personality, he is always protective of his younger sister Kyōka to the point where he even has guards secretly follow her around without her knowledge of it. Kyōma strongly dislikes and disapproves of Tohru's close relationship with Kyōka as he sees Tohru as a man that won't be able protect her. Kyōma will go various lengths to prevent them from being together even to go as far as physically hitting Tohru. These actions will often come at the cost of being hit or slapped by Kyōka followed by being called "Stupid Big Brother". Despite his disapproval of Tohru and Kyōka's relationship, he does seem to show some respect and trust in Tohru as the series progresses.

Main Weapon: UZI (x2)
Kyōma's personal bodyguard, she is a young descendant of an assassin clan. The Rindo family has served under the Katagiri family for generations as bodyguards, spies, and assassins. Despite her small size, Shizune is very agile and proficient with blades and carries a number of throwing items (knives, small swords, blades, etc.) and some exploding devices. As Kyōma's personal bodyguard, she is very protective of him to the point where she will even sacrifice her life for his without hesitation. It is implied that she has romantic feeling for Kyōma.

Main Weapon: Stationary Gatling Beam Vulcan/Deflecting Shield
Remy is a child who possessed ESP powers. He was subjected to experiments and lab probings since he could first remember. Soon after, he was drafted into the war with Frontier S. Remy is entirely reliant on his psychic powers to fight. He uses his ability to fly and manipulate objects for both offense and defense. His power can be amplified by directly consuming an Energy Cube, but the resultant boost drives his power beyond his ability to control it.

 Miki is a child that appears in Tohru's dream in the beginning of the series. She appears throughout the series as a "ghost" that guides Tohru and gives him visions to save both universe's futures as well as hers from being swallowed by the Dead End. Due to coming back to the past, she cannot remember her own name to which Tohru names her "Miki" (The character Mirrai = Future, but read as "Miki"). The two make a promise to one day meet again in the future. At the end of the series, it is revealed that she is the granddaughter of Tohru and Kyōka.

Other characters

Gunslinger Stratos

Gunslinger Stratos 2

Gunslinger Stratos 3

Media

Anime
The opening theme is "Vanilla Sky" by Mashiro Ayano and the ending theme is "Mirai" by Garnidelia.

Episode list

References

External links
 Official anime website

A-1 Pictures
Action anime and manga
Animated television series about robots
Anime and manga about parallel universes
Anime television series based on video games
Aniplex
Fiction about government
Mecha
Superheroes in anime and manga
Television series set in the future
Television shows set in Asia
Television shows set in Europe
Television shows set in Japan
Television shows set in London
Television shows set in Tokyo
Television shows set in the United Kingdom
Tokyo MX original programming
Works based on Square Enix video games
Works based on Ubisoft video games